Zürisee may refer to:

 The Swiss German/Alemannic name for Lake Zurich in Switzerland
 Obersee (Zürichsee), the smaller part of Lake Zurich
 Radio Zürisee, airing from Rapperswil
 Verkehrsbetriebe Zürichsee und Oberland
 Zürisee (ship, 1999), a car ferry that operates on Lake Zurich in Switzerland
 Zürichsee-Schifffahrtsgesellschaft, the Lake Zurich ship operator
 Zürichsee-Zeitung, a newspaper